Nishagandhi Dance Festival, organised by the Kerala Tourism Department, is a one-week festival of classical dances held annually in the Nishagandhi amphitheatre, Kanakakkunnu Palace, Thiruvananthapuram. It usually happened in the last week of January, every year.

The festival highlights the richness of the Indian classical dance styles such as Kathak, Bharatanatyam, Odissi, Kuchipudi, Manipuri and Kathakali with performances of some of the best exponents in the field. In addition, a Kathakali fest is also be conducted inside the Palace.

The Nishagandhi Puraskaram or Nishagandhi award has been presented during the festival since 2013. Mrinalini Sarabhai, Bharatanatyam danseuse, was the first winner of the award.

References 

Indian classical music
Dance festivals in India
Festivals in Kerala
Tourist attractions in Kerala
January events
Annual events in India